Varun Kumar is the name of:

Varun Kumar (cricketer) (born 1980), Indian cricketer
Varun Kumar (field hockey) (born 1995), Indian field hockey player
Varun Kumar (journalist) (born 1985), Indian journalist